Amala Chebolu is a playback singer in the Telugu film industry, also known as Tollywood.

Personal life and education 
Amala Chebolu, a native of Visakhapatnam, daughter of Saraswathi Chebolu, a vocalist, and Dr. Gopalakrishna Murthy, a Professor in Economics.  Amala completed her B.Tech from Gandhi Institute of Technology and Management, Visakhapatnam.

Career
Amala started her cultural pursuit at a very early age and got training in music from Pantula Rama, a renowned Carnatic music vocalist.

She began her singing career as a playback singer in films at the age of 21. Sekhar Chandra, a music director first gave her a chance to sing the title song of the film Maaya directed by the national award-winning G. Neelakanta Reddy and produced by Madhura Sreedhar Reddy and her debut song is ‘Kalayedo Nijamedo’.

Discography

Filmography
Voice artist

References

Living people
Indian women playback singers
Indian voice actresses
Filmfare Awards South winners
Singers from Andhra Pradesh
Telugu playback singers
Musicians from Visakhapatnam
Year of birth missing (living people)
Film musicians from Andhra Pradesh
Women musicians from Andhra Pradesh
21st-century Indian women singers
21st-century Indian singers